Pulsatilla nuttalliana, known as American pasqueflower, prairie pasqueflower, prairie crocus, cutleaf anemone, or simply pasqueflower, is a flowering plant native to much of North America, from the western side of Lake Michigan, to northern Canada in the Northwest Territories, south to New Mexico in the southwestern United States.

Pasqueflower is the provincial flower of Manitoba and the state flower of South Dakota.

In the Dakota language it is called "hokski-chekpa wahcha" (twin flower). In Lakota it is "hoksi' cekpa" (child's navel) as a reference to the similar apperance of the flower's bud to a new born's navel when healing. In their own language people of the Blackfeet Nation call it "Napi" (old man) for the gray silky heads.

It was first formally named in 1817 as Anemone nuttalliana. It is sometimes considered a subspecies or variety of Pulsatilla patens (Anemone patens).

References

nuttalliana
Flora of North America
Provincial symbols of Manitoba